Sanchari is a 1981 Indian Malayalam film. Sanchari may also refer to:

Swapna Sanchari, a 2011 Malayalam film
Sanchari Vijay (1983–2021), Indian theatre and film actor